Lempi is a feminine Finnish given name. Notable people with the name include:

Lempi Ikävalko (1901–1994), Finnish writer, poet, actress, and artist
Lempi Tuomi (1882–1958), Finnish politician

Finnish feminine given names